Cuanman was an ethnic group in northern Yunnan, China. They came into power after assisting Zhuge Liang's Southern Campaign and dominated Yunnan during the Northern and Southern dynasties period. They were defeated by the Sui dynasty in 602 and split into the Baiman and Wuman, allegedly the ancestors of modern-day Bai people and Yi people.

History
According to the tomb tablet of Cuan Longyan, they were descended from a famous official in Shanxi, however it was common at the time to create fictitious lineages linking indigenous elites back to China, and it's also highly likely that the Cuans were originally native to Yunnan. In 549, a native from Ningzhou rose to power. The Northern Zhou dynasty granted him the title of prefectural governor(刺史) of Southern Ningzhou(南寧州). In contemporary Chinese historical records, the polity was called "Xicuan guo" (Western Cuan State). The Cuan sent tribute to Northern Zhou and the Sui dynasty. However Cuan power was broken in 597 and 602 when the Sui invaded. Cuan surrendered to the Sui and was executed but the Sui did not set up direct rule over the region. After Cuan Zan died, the Cuan were split between two rulers, Cuan Wan and Cuan Zhen. The son of Cuan Wan was later sent home by Emperor Taizong of Tang and made the prefect of Kunzhou (Kunzhou) The Cuan were divided in half between the east, known as the Wuman/Black Mywa (烏蠻), and the west, known as the Baiman/White Mywa (白蠻). In 737, Piluoge of the Wuman tribe, Mengshe, united the Wuman tribes and founded Nanzhao (南詔).

In 618, the Tang dynasty assigned Duan Lun as Commander-in-Chief (zongguan) to Yizhou (Chengdu). Cuan Hongda, Wan's son, was assigned to Kunzhou as prefect. Duan sent his subordinate, Yu Dashi, into Hongda's territory to persuade local tribes to give their allegiance to the Tang. Western Cuan was the first to pledge allegiance. In 621, a Tang official, Ji Hongwei, arrived in Nanning (Qujing) and won over more tribes. Some 30 jimi prefectures were created. However exorbitant taxation of the local population caused them to rebel. Duan sentenced them all to death. He was removed from power and transferred back to the capital. After Hongda died, the local chieftains requested the prefectures return to hereditary rule.

Rulers
Cuan Xi 231
Cuan Gu 265
Cuan Liang 327-330
Cuan Chen 330-340
Cuan Wei 345
Cuan Baozi 405
Cuan Longyan 445
Cuan Yun 514
Cuan Zan 548

Baiman (White Mywa)
Cuan Wan
Cuan Hongda
Cuan Guiwang
Acha (Guiwang's wife as regent) 
Cuan Shouyu

Wuman (Black Mywa)
Cuan Zhen
Cuan Qianfu
Cuan Sishao
Cuan Rijin
Cuan Chongdao
Cuan Fuchao

References

Bibliography

Tang dynasty people
Social history of China